The Brazilian nobility refers to the titled aristocrats and fidalgo people and families recognized by the Kingdom of Brazil and later, by the Empire of Brazil, dating back to the early 19th century, when Brazil ceased to be a colony of the Kingdom of Portugal. It held official status until 1889, when a military coup d'état overthrew the monarchy and established the First Brazilian Republic.

History

The Brazilian nobility originated from the Portuguese nobility, during the time of colonial Brazil; the noble titles were a sign of political power among the elite. Some of the nobles were members of Portuguese noble lineages and even of the high nobility, especially the families that arrived during the first centuries of the colonization of Bahia, Sergipe, Pernambuco, Rio de Janeiro and São Paulo. The elevation of Brazil to the status of Kingdom, under the United Kingdom of Portugal, Brazil and the Algarves in 1815, led to the creation of the first Brazilian noble titles. With the Independence of Brazil from Portugal in 1822, the Empire of Brazil established its own system of nobility.

According to the Brazilian Constitution of 1824, only the Emperor had the right to confer titles and ranks on non-nobles. Unlike the former Portuguese and Luso-Brazilian titles—and most systems of aristocracy—a Brazilian noble title was only for the holder's lifetime and could not be inherited, similar to a British life peer.  All nobles, regardless of title and rank, were entitled to the style of Excellency.

During the reign of Dom Pedro II and the advent of the commercialization of coffee, it was the great coffee-growers who began to collect such titles, being acquaintances of the coffee barons. According to Affonso de Taunay, around 300 holders had their income linked to coffee: farmers, bankers and traders. The title of baron thus became a symbol of the legitimization of local power, making those who held it intermediaries between the people and the government.

During this period the Brazilian Imperial Family sought to efface republican sentiments with a wide distribution of titles, mainly among important political leaders in the provinces, some aristocrats and also members of provincial oligarchies; 114 were awarded in 1888, and 123 in 1889.

Republic

With the proclamation of the republic in 1889, the aristocracy was abolished and all Brazilian titles of nobility were banned. It was also prohibited, under penalty of accusation of high treason and the suspension of political rights, to accept noble titles and foreign decorations without the permission of the State. However, nobles of greater distinction, out of respect and tradition, were allowed to use their titles during the republican regime; a well-known example is the Baron of Rio Branco. The Imperial Family was not allowed to return until 1921, when the Law of Exile was repealed by President Epitácio Pessoa.

Acquisition
To be qualified for ennoblement, one could not be of illegitimate birth, be previously charged for lese-majeste, or have a history of engagement in a mechanical trade or be of "impure" blood (e.g., Jewish ancestry, the law of sangre pura). Most had to pay a large sum for the conferral of noble status (the Portuguese monarchs sold titles for payment to raise funds giving Portugal many nobles, 600+ families, for a small population), even if titles passed to their descendants.

A recipient had to pay the following fees depending on the title given, in contos de réis, according to the table of April 2, 1860:

In addition to these amounts, there were the following costs:

Roles for the petition: 366$000
Coat of arms registration: 170$000

A list of possible grantees was drawn up by the Council of Ministers, with recommendations from their colleagues, provincial presidents, other nobles, politicians, senior officials, and other influential people. The lists were sent to the approval of the Emperor, being presented, twice a year: December 2, the anniversary of the Emperor; March 14 or 25, respectively, the anniversary of the Empress and the anniversary of the oath of the Constitution of the Brazilian Empire of 1824—the first Brazilian constitutional charter.

Some Brazilian nobles were given the distinction "with grandeeship," which allowed them to use in their coat of arms the crown of the next higher title—for example, a baron could wear the viscount's coronet on his coat of arms. Also, a Grandee of the Empire enjoyed other privileges and precedence that holders of the next superior title enjoyed. The grandeeship was conferred on 135 barons, who used the viscomital coronet in their coats of arms, and 146 viscounts, who used the comital coronet.

Registration of nobility
All records of the nobility were made in the books of the Office of Nobility and Knighthood until 1848, when they disappeared under unexplained circumstances. At the time, they were the responsibility of Possidonio da Fonseca Costa, the then-King of Arms, which greatly hindered the registration of noble titles granted during the First Reign of the Empire. Luis Aleixo Boulanger, his successor, sought to recover part of this documentation, producing a single book with part of the first generation of the Brazilian nobility.

Throughout the entirety of the Empire's existence, 1,211 titles of nobility were created: 3 dukes, 47 marquises, 51 counts, 235 viscounts and 875 barons. The total number of recipients, however, was lower—around 980—as many received more than one title. These numbers are not entirely accurate, as there are doubts about the validity and even the existence of some titles. Much of this doubt stems from the loss of some of the records of the Office of Nobility and Knighthood during the Brazilian First Republic.

Untitled nobility
Brazilian nobility comprised also a large body of untitled nobles, some ennobled for life by holding civic or military offices, and others by tradition. In the first class stood all people distinguished by imperial honorific orders; all officers-majors (oficiais-mores) working for the Court; high military officers; high magistrates such as State councillors, judges, senators and ministers, as well as big merchants, lawyers and doctors of liberal arts. The second group of hereditary untitled nobility was comprised by the landed gentry.

Symbols

Royal titles

Noble titles

Famous nobles

Dukes
 Auguste de Beauharnais, Duke of Santa Cruz, Prince Consort of Portugal
 Luís Alves de Lima e Silva, Duke of Caxias, military general
 Isabel Maria de Alcântara, Duchess of Goiás, illegitimate daughter of Emperor Pedro I

Marquesses
 Pedro de Araújo Lima, Marquis of Olinda
 Domitila de Castro do Canto e Melo, Marchioness of Santos
 Thomas Cochrane, 10th Earl of Dundonald, 1st Marquess of Maranhão
 Honório Hermeto Carneiro Leão, Marquis of Paraná
 Manuel Luís Osório, Marquis of Erval

Counts
 Joaquim Xavier Curado, Count of São João das Duas Barras
 Luísa Margarida de Barros Portugal, Countess of Barral
 Mariana Carlota de Verna Magalhães Coutinho, Countess of Belmonte
 Manuel Marques de Sousa, Count of Porto Alegre

Viscounts
 Alfredo d'Escragnolle Taunay, Viscount of Taunay
 Afonso Celso, Viscount of Ouro Preto
 Francisco Adolfo de Varnhagen, Viscount of Porto Seguro
 Irineu Evangelista de Sousa, Viscount of Mauá
 José Paranhos, Viscount of Rio Branco
 Joaquim José Inácio, Viscount of Inhaúma
 Domingos Custódio Guimarães, Viscount of Rio Preto
 Joaquim Henrique de Araújo, Viscount of Pirassununga

Barons
 José Maria da Silva Paranhos Júnior, Baron of Rio Branco
 Henrique Hermeto Carneiro Leão, Baron of Paraná
 Gregório Francisco de Miranda, Baron of Abadia (1795 - 1850)
 Maria Izabel Cardoso Gusmão, baronese of Abadia
 Domingos Custódio Guimarães Filho, Baron of Rio Preto
 José Pedro da Motta Sayão, Baron of Pilar

References

Literature
 Schwarcz, Lilia Moritz. As barbas do Imperador: D. Pedro II, um monarca nos trópicos. 2. Ed. São Paulo: Companhia das Letras, 1998.
 

 
Social class in Brazil
Titles of nobility in the Americas
Nobility of the Americas